Cristina Llovera Rossell (born 1 October 1996 in Andorra la Vella) is an Andorran runner. She competed at the 2012 Summer Olympics in the Women's 100 metres where she was eliminated in the preliminary round. Llovera was the youngest participant in the Athletics competition.

In 2016 an injury deprived her of repeating that experience in Rio de Janeiro's Olympic Games. Two months before the event se had a spondylosis, a small fracture in a vertebra, which left her without options.

Notes

References

External links 
 
 
 
 
 

1996 births
Living people
Andorran female sprinters
Olympic athletes of Andorra
Athletes (track and field) at the 2012 Summer Olympics
European Games competitors for Andorra
Athletes (track and field) at the 2015 European Games
Olympic female sprinters